is a railway station in the city of Gujō, Gifu Prefecture, Japan, operated by the third sector railway operator Nagaragawa Railway.

Lines

Station layout
Kamimanba Station has a one ground-level side platform serving a single bi-directional track.  The station is unattended.

Adjacent stations

History
Kamimanba Station was opened on 21 September 1987.

Surrounding area
 Nagara River

See also
 List of Railway Stations in Japan

References

External links

 

Railway stations in Japan opened in 1987
Railway stations in Gifu Prefecture
Stations of Nagaragawa Railway
Gujō, Gifu